Anne Lackman (born 13 September 1969) is a Finnish backstroke swimmer. She competed in two events at the 1992 Summer Olympics.

References

External links
 

1969 births
Living people
Finnish female backstroke swimmers
Olympic swimmers of Finland
Swimmers at the 1992 Summer Olympics
People from Lieksa
Sportspeople from North Karelia